Ekkachai Janthana (born 10 February 1977) is a Thai sprinter. He competed in the men's 4 × 100 metres relay at the 1996 Summer Olympics.

References

1977 births
Living people
Athletes (track and field) at the 1996 Summer Olympics
Ekkachai Janthana
Ekkachai Janthana
Place of birth missing (living people)
Asian Games medalists in athletics (track and field)
Ekkachai Janthana
Athletes (track and field) at the 1998 Asian Games
Athletes (track and field) at the 2002 Asian Games
Athletes (track and field) at the 2006 Asian Games
Medalists at the 2002 Asian Games
Medalists at the 2006 Asian Games
Southeast Asian Games medalists in athletics
Ekkachai Janthana
Competitors at the 2001 Southeast Asian Games
Ekkachai Janthana
Ekkachai Janthana